Guillermo Molina Ríos (born 16 March 1984 in Ceuta) is a Spanish water polo player who competed for the Spain men's national water polo team in four consecutive Summer Olympics (2004 Athens, 2008 Beijing, 2012 London and 2016 Rio. He was the joint top goalscorer at the 2016 Olympics, with 19 goals. Afterwards he competed for Italy men's national water polo team in the 2018 Men's European Water Polo Championship. He helped Italian water polo club Pro Recco win the LEN Champions League in 2009–10 and 2011–12 season.

See also
 Spain men's Olympic water polo team records and statistics
 List of players who have appeared in multiple men's Olympic water polo tournaments
 List of men's Olympic water polo tournament top goalscorers
 List of world champions in men's water polo
 List of World Aquatics Championships medalists in water polo

References

External links
 

1984 births
Living people
Spanish male water polo players
Italian male water polo players
Olympic water polo players of Spain
Water polo players at the 2004 Summer Olympics
Water polo players at the 2008 Summer Olympics
Water polo players at the 2012 Summer Olympics
Water polo players at the 2016 Summer Olympics
World Aquatics Championships medalists in water polo
Mediterranean Games silver medalists for Spain
Mediterranean Games medalists in water polo
Competitors at the 2013 Mediterranean Games